Hans Hedtoft Hansen (21 April 1903 – 29 January 1955) was a Danish politician of the Social Democrats who served as Prime Minister of Denmark from 1947 to 1950 and again from 1953 until his death in 1955. He also served as the first President of the Nordic Council in 1953.

Hedtoft was married to Ella Gudrun Ingeborg Holleufer. She died in 1954 from Addison's disease, aged 48.

Political career
Hedtoft was a Social Democrat, and had taken over the leadership of his party from Thorvald Stauning in 1939, but was forced by the Nazis to resign his posts in 1941 because he was too critical of the German occupation of Denmark. In September 1943, he was instrumental in starting the rescue of the Danish Jews.

During his time as Prime Minister, progressive taxation was introduced, together with other reforms. The Public Assistance Act of April 1949 introduced special treatment and assistance (transferred from communal assistance or poor relief) for TB patients, while the law on measures for the deaf and dumb of January 1950 introduced special provisions for the deaf and partially deaf within the framework for the special care of handicapped persons. In addition, the Home Help Act of April 1949 obliged municipalities to operate home help services, while regulations relating to pottery factories were issued.

After the failure to create a Scandinavian defence union, Denmark joined NATO in 1949. In October 1950 his government lost a vote on lifting the rationing of butter. Because this failure to get his policy through signalled that his party had lost its parliamentary support, new elections were called. Erik Eriksen from the Liberal Party was able to form the Cabinet of Erik Eriksen together with the Conservative People's Party on 30 October 1950.

On 30 September 1953 Hedtoft was able to return as Prime Minister, and formed the Cabinet of Hans Hedtoft II, consisting only of the Social Democrats. He did not have the support of the Danish Social Liberal Party as they were unsatisfied with the large amount of resources allocated to the military because of Denmark's obligations to NATO.

On 29 January 1955 Hedtoft died suddenly from a heart attack while in a meeting in the Nordic Council in Stockholm. He was succeeded as Prime Minister by his friend and Foreign Minister H. C. Hansen. The liner MS Hans Hedtoft was named after him.  Unfortunately, on its maiden voyage in 1959, the ship struck an iceberg and sank off the coast of Greenland.  It is the last ship known to have been sunk by an iceberg, with casualties.  There were no survivors.

References

 Kristian Hvidt, Statsministre i Danmark fra 1913 til 1995 (1995)
 Growth to Limits: The Western European Welfare States Since World War II, Volume 4 edited by Peter Flora
 INDUSTRIAL SAFETY SURVEY, VOLUME XXVI, 1950
 Hans Hedtoft. Encyclopædia Britannica.

1903 births
1955 deaths
People from Aarhus
Prime Ministers of Denmark
Members of the Folketing
Members of the Executive of the Labour and Socialist International
Burials at Vestre Cemetery, Copenhagen
20th-century Danish politicians
Leaders of the Social Democrats (Denmark)